Eino Huhtala (born 18 November 1938) is a Finnish cross-country skier. He competed in the men's 15 kilometre event at the 1964 Winter Olympics.

Cross-country skiing results
All results are sourced from the International Ski Federation (FIS).

Olympic Games

References

External links
 

1938 births
Living people
Finnish male cross-country skiers
Olympic cross-country skiers of Finland
Cross-country skiers at the 1964 Winter Olympics
People from Siikajoki
Sportspeople from North Ostrobothnia
20th-century Finnish people